|}

The Doncaster Stakes is a Listed flat horse race in Great Britain open to horses aged two years only.
It is run at Doncaster over a distance of 6 furlongs and 2 yards (1,209 metres), and it is scheduled to take place each year in October. Prior to 1993 it was run over 5 furlongs. A notable earlier winner in 1979 was Moorestyle, ridden by Lester Piggott, who went on to be Horse of the Year in 1980.

Winners since 1988

See also
 Horse racing in Great Britain
 List of British flat horse races

References 

Racing Post: 

Flat races in Great Britain
Doncaster Racecourse
Flat horse races for two-year-olds